Pseudima is a genus of flowering plants belonging to the family Sapindaceae.

Its native range is Costa Rica to Southern Tropical America.

Species:

Pseudima frutescens 
Pseudima pallidum

References

Sapindaceae
Sapindaceae genera